Like Weather is the debut studio album by English electronic musician Leila. It was released on 30 March 1998 by Rephlex Records.

Critical reception

Reviewing Like Weather for AllMusic, John Bush noted the album's "tremendously eclectic" tone, which he said "is of an experimentalism far in advance of other electronic singer/songwriter acts out there."

At the end of 1998, NME named Like Weather the year's 10th best album. In 2015, it was placed at number six on Facts list of the best trip hop albums of all time, with the magazine calling it "a hazy, underwater daydream of a record with half-heard soul, pop and chiming ice cream truck electronics swirling together in a soup of memory and emotion. Not quite trip-hop and not quite illbient, it certainly wasn't IDM either." Two years later, Fact listed Like Weather as one of the best albums of 1998, and Pitchfork ranked it as the 39th best IDM album of all time.

Track listing

Sample credits
 "Won't You Be My Baby, Baby" contains samples of "Break It Up", written by Brian Auger and Roger Sutton and performed by Brian Auger and the Trinity and Julie Driscoll.

Personnel
Credits are adapted from the album's liner notes.

 Leila – production, mixing, recording
 Ali Akbar – arrangement consultancy (track 6)
 Roya Arab – vocals (track 5)
 Richard D. James – post-production editing
 Dan Lipman – alto flute (track 5)
 Donna Paul – vocals (tracks 4, 10)
 Luca Santucci – vocals (tracks 1, 2, 7, 9, 12, 13)
 Paul Solomons – post-production editing
 Benet Walsh – violin (track 6)
 Gabriel Walsh – trumpet (track 12)

Charts

References

External links
 

1998 debut albums
Leila (music producer) albums
Albums recorded in a home studio
Rephlex Records albums